Magdalena Kuras (born 14 May 1988) is a Swedish freestyle swimmer representing Malmö KK. She represented Sweden in the 2007 World Aquatics Championships, where she swum the 100 m freestyle and the 4 × 100 m freestyle relay and in the 2008 European Aquatics Championships, where she won a bronze medal in the 4 × 100 m freestyle relay along with Claire Hedenskog, Josefin Lillhage, Ida Marko-Varga.

Personal bests

Long course (50 m)

Short course (25 m)

Clubs
 Malmö KK

References

1988 births
Swedish female backstroke swimmers
Swedish female butterfly swimmers
European Aquatics Championships medalists in swimming
Malmö KK swimmers
Living people
Swedish female freestyle swimmers
21st-century Swedish women